Brothers was launched in 1782 at Liverpool as a Guineaman. She made seven complete voyages as a slave ship in the triangular trade in enslaved people. A French privateer captured her in 1795, on her eighth voyage after she had embarked her captives. In a highly unusual move, the privateer sold Brothers and her slaves to the master of a Spanish vessel that the privateer had captured. The purchaser then took Brothers into Havana.

Career
Brothers first appeared in Lloyd's Register (LR), in the issue for 1783.

1st slave voyage (1783–1784): Captain Robert Kendall sailed from Liverpool on 18 April 1783. He acquired slaves in the Sierra Leone estuary. On 1 January 1784 Brothers was reported on the coast of Africa, together with several other slave ships, including . Brothers arrived at Grenada on 2 April 1784 with 180 slaves, and landed 179. She sailed from Grenada on 11 May and arrived back at Liverpool on 14 June. She had left Liverpool with 23 crew member and had suffered eight crew deaths on her voyage.

2nd slave voyage (1784–1785): Captain Kendall sailed from Liverpool on 28 July 1784. He acquired slaves in the Sierra Leone estuary. Brothers arrived at Grenada on 9 March 1785 with 253 slaves and landed 248. She sailed from Grenada on 29 March and arrived back at Liverpool on 17 May. She had left Liverpool with 27 crew members and had suffered one crew death on her voyage.

3rd slave voyage (1785–1786): Captain Joshua Pugmor (or Pugmore), sailed from Liverpool on 29 June 1785. Pugmore died on 1 October 1785. Captain Joseph Clarke replaced Pugmore. They acquired slaves at Cape Mount. Brothers, late Pugmore, master, was reported to have been there on 2 December with 207 slaves. Brothers arrived at Dominica on 18 April 1786 with 220 slaves. She arrived back at Liverpool on 29 June. She had left Liverpool with 26 crew members and had suffered five crew deaths on her voyage.

4th slave voyage (1786–1788): Captain Richard Kendall sailed from Liverpool on 27 August 1786. He acquired slaves in the Sierra Leone estuary. Brothers arrived at Barbados on 9 February 1788 with 230 slaves. She sailed from Barbados on 6 March and arrived back at Liverpool on 12 April. When she arrived her master was again Joseph Clark. It is not clear when the substitution occurred. She had left Liverpool with 27 crew members and had suffered seven crew deaths on her voyage.

5th slave voyage (1788–1789): Captain Joseph Clark sailed from Liverpool on 14 September 1789. He acquired slaves in the Sierra Leone estuary. Brothers arrived at Grenada on 5 June 1789 with 188 slaves. She arrived back at Liverpool on 18 September. She had left with 23 crew members and had suffered three crew deaths on her voyage.

6th slave voyage (1790–1792): Captain Alexander Finley sailed from Liverpool on 14 November 1790. He started acquiring slaves at Cape Mount on 1 January 1791. Brothers sailed from Africa on 3 August and arrived at Montego Bay on 25 September. She had embarked 211 slaves and arrived with 209, for a mortality rate of 1%. She arrived back at Liverpool on 16 January 1792. She had left with 17 crew members and had suffered three crew deaths on her voyage.

The Liverpool merchant John Dawson became co-owner of Brothers with Thomas Clarke.

7th slave voyage (1792–1793): Captain Thomas Payne sailed from Liverpool on 6 May 1792. He started acquiring slaves on 13 June at Iles de Los. He then went on to Cape Mount. Brothers sailed from Africa on 22 April and arrived at Montego Bay on 29 May. She had embarked 214 slaves and she arrived with 212, for a mortality rate of 1%. She arrived back at Liverpool on 28 September. She had left Liverpool with 31 cew members and had suffered five crew deaths on her voyage.

8th slave voyage (1794–loss): In May 1795, Captain Archibald Galbraith sailed from Liverpool. At end-April 1795 Lloyd's List reported that Brothers, Galbraith, master, had arrived at Grenada from Africa.

Fate

Initial report
The French privateer Brutus, from Charleston, captured Brothers in mid-March 1795 at Cape San Antonio, Cuba, as Brothers was on her way to Havana. Brutus sold Brothers to a Spaniard, who took her into Havana.

Fuller story
Captain Ignacio Pica outfitted Nuestra Señora del Carmen with goods and provisions for a slaving expedition in 1794. While sailing in the Caribbean, she encountered the French privateer Brutus in April 1795.

Captain Pica, realizing that Brutus was more powerful than Nuestra Señora del Carmen, immediately surrendered. Brutus took her captive under tow and sailed back towards Charleston.

Five days later, Brutus encountered Brothers.{{efn|Spanish records name '"Brothers Dos hermanos, or Two Brothers.}} Galbraith resisted Brutus, but eventually was forced to strike after Brothers had suffered structural damage, had lost some of her provisions, and water, and had suffered a death among the slaves she was carrying.

While Captain Garican was deciding what to do with his two prizes, Captain Pica made him an offer. Pica offered to buy Brothers and her 207 slaves for a note worth "$25000 pesos". As France and Spain were at war, Gariscan could not take Brothers into Havana. The three vessels (Brutus, Nuestra Señora del Carmen, and Brothers), sailed to Charleston. From there Pica and Brothers sailed to Havana. Brothers arrived at Havana on 22 March 1795, under the command of Captain Pica. She had embarked 216 slaves and arrived with 208, for a 4% mortality rate. Philip Allwood, an agent for Brothers, requested that the Merchant Tribunal in Havana issue an injunction returning the 207 slaves to Brothers owners. 

Galbraith sailed from Havana on 13 May and arrived at Liverpool in July. Chaser'' was in Havana as a French privateer had captured her but two Spanish frigates had recaptured her and taken her into Havana.

Notes

Citations

References
 
 
 

1782 ships
Liverpool slave ships
Captured ships